Taeniotes buckleyi is a species of beetle in the family Cerambycidae. It was described by Henry Walter Bates in 1872. It is known from Peru and Ecuador.

References

buckleyi
Beetles described in 1872